Aloeides susanae, the Susan's copper, is a butterfly of the family Lycaenidae. It is found in South Africa, where it is found from the KwaZulu-Natal midlands to the Free State and the Eastern Cape.

The wingspan is 21–24 mm for males and 22–26 mm females. Adults are on wing from September to January. There is one, or possibly two, generations per year.

References

Butterflies described in 1973
Aloeides
Endemic butterflies of South Africa